Arno Klasen (born 1967 in Karlshausen, Germany) is a German racecar driver best known for his long career in VLN endurance racing series on the Nürburgring. He has collected 26 overall wins in the category, ranking fourth after Jürgen Alzen, Olaf Manthey and Ullrich Richter.

Klasen started his career in karting. He entered VLN in 1994, scoring several overall wins, mainly on Jürgen Alzen Porsche.

Klasen was also on the Seikel Motorsport roster for the 2004 Le Mans Series season, but he never raced.

He entered for the 2006 24 Hours of Le Mans.

External links
Driver DB Profile

1971 births
German racing drivers
Living people
European Le Mans Series drivers
People from Bitburg-Prüm
Racing drivers from Rhineland-Palatinate
24H Series drivers

Nürburgring 24 Hours drivers